Zastavna Raion was an administrative raion (district) in the southern part of Chernivtsi Oblast in western Ukraine, on the Romanian border. Most of its territory lied in the historical region of Bukovina, while three localities (Balamutivka, Rzhavyntsi, and southern Onut) are located in Bessarabia. The raion was abolished on 18 July 2020 as part of the administrative reform of Ukraine, which reduced the number of raions of Chernivtsi Oblast to three. The area of Zastavna Raion was merged into Chernivtsi Raion. The last estimate of the raion population was 

At the time of disestablishment, the raion consisted of seven hromadas:
 Horishni Sherivtsi rural hromada with the administration in the selo of Horishni Sherivtsi;
 Kadubivtsi rural hromada with the administration in the selo of Kadubivtsi;
 Kostryzhivka settlement hromada with the administration in the urban-type settlement of Kostryzhivka;
 Verenchanka rural hromada with the administration in the selo of Verenchanka;
 Vikno rural hromada with the administration in the selo of Vikno;
 Yurkivtsi rural hromada with the administration in the selo of Yurkivtsi;
 Zastavna urbam hromada with the administration in Zastavna.

See also
Subdivisions of Ukraine

References

Former raions of Chernivtsi Oblast
1940 establishments in Ukraine
Ukrainian raions abolished during the 2020 administrative reform